The Grand Comoro brush warbler (Nesillas brevicaudata) is a species of Old World warbler in the family Acrocephalidae.
It is found in Comoros and Mayotte.
Its natural habitat is subtropical or tropical moist montane forests.

References

Grand Comoro brush warbler
Endemic birds of the Comoros
Birds of Mayotte
Grand Comoro brush warbler
Taxonomy articles created by Polbot